Ricardo Freire (5 May 1919 - deceased) was a Portuguese footballer who played as a full back.

He joined Benfica in 1938, but rarely ever played during his six years there. He made a total of 31 appearances, winning two titles.

Career
Freire joined Benfica in 1936, making his debut on 25 October, against Belenenses. He was exclusively used in the Campeonato de Lisboa, playing eight games and scoring seven goals. A seldom used player, competition from Gaspar Pinto and Elói made him a fringe player, appearing in only 10 games from 1938 until 1941.

In 1941–42, he gained his place in the first team alongside Gaspar Pinto, helping Benfica win the league, making seven appearances.
Following another season without receiving playing time in the league, he left the club, with 31 matches played and seven goals.

Honours
Benfica
Primeira Divisão: 1941–42
Taça de Portugal: 1939–40

References
General
 

Specific

1919 births
Year of death unknown
Portuguese footballers
Association football defenders
Primeira Liga players
S.L. Benfica footballers